The Maccabees was a volunteer neighborhood patrol organization that operated in Crown Heights, Brooklyn from 1964 to 1971. Hasidic rabbi Samuel Schrage founded the group in 1964 to counter a rising crime wave in the neighborhood. During its peak, the group had a membership of 500 men, most of them young and Jewish. With the local population feeling more secure and improved police protection, the Maccabbees dissolved in 1971. According to The New York Times, the Maccabees "overcame the reputation of being antiblack vigilantes." 

The Maccabees are considered the forerunner and inspiration for today's neighborhood patrol groups in Brooklyn and beyond, the Shomrim and Shmira.

Rabbi Schrage died on December 31, 1976, at the age of 44.

References

1964 establishments in New York City
Neighborhood watch organizations
Jews and Judaism in Brooklyn
1971 disestablishments in New York (state)
Crown Heights, Brooklyn
Jewish organizations based in New York City